Neighbors United (NU) is a non-profit organization founded in 2007, by the residents of Capitol Hill East. Neighbors United is an organization focused on providing academic, recreational, and technological programming to youth and adults in low-income communities within Washington, D.C. 
 
In 2007, the Council of the District of Columbia granted Neighbors United $350,000 to implement youth programming. Funding was presented in the form of an earmark (politics), which was backed by politiciansTommy Wells and Kwame R. Brown.

History
Neighbors United was formed when the District of Columbia’s oldest Boys and Girls Club of Greater Washington (BGCGW) announced plans to close its Eastern Branch at 261 17th Street, SE, leaving the youth and elderly in the community without a safe organized recreational outlet. Neighbors United’s mission is to provide support, services, and enriching opportunities for children, youth and adults in the District of Columbia. In the spring of 2010, NU formed a collaborative with Kidney Kare 4 Youth & Adolescents, Inc (KK4YA) a non-profit focused on health and nutrition.

Programs
Neighbors United partners with several local community-based organizations to provide the following services:
 Hip Hop Education in partnership with International Association of Hip Hop Education
 Health and Nutrition Education in partnership with Kidney Kare 4 Youth & Adolescents
 Martial Arts in partnership with Full Circle Martial Arts Academy
 Dance Class in partnership with the Bren-Car School of Dance
 General Education Development (GED) Test Preparation
 NSTEP Study Buddy- Peer-to-Peer Math Tutoring
 Adult Basic Education (ABE)also known as Adult Education

Partners
 Payne Elementary School of District of Columbia Public Schools
 DC Children and Youth Investment Trust Corporation
 District of Columbia Office of the State Superintendent (education) of Education (OSSE) Adult and Family Education Division

References
 D.C. Fiscal Policy Institute FY 2009 Earmarks 
 Neighbors United Sourced

External links 
 Neighbors United web site
 OSSE Adult and Family Education Division Website

Non-profit organizations based in Washington, D.C.